Afek is a Jewish surname. Notable people with the surname include:

 Arnon Afek (born 1963), Israeli physician 
 Omri Afek (born 1979), retired Israeli footballer
 Sharon Afek (born 1970), Israeli general
 Yehuda Afek (born 1952), Israeli computer scientist
 Yochanan Afek (born 1952), Israeli chess player, composer, trainer and arbiter

References 

Jewish surnames
Hebrew-language surnames
Surnames of Israeli origin